Jisonaayili is a community in Sagnarigu District in the Northern Region of Ghana. It is a linear settlement concentrated along the Jisonayili Road that divides the community into two halves. The immediate neighboring communities include Kanvili, Gurugu, Chogu-Yapalsi and Kamina Barracks. The community is served by a public library located in the Jisonaayili Community Center. 

The community is under the leadership of a local chief enstooled by the main chief of Tamale (Gukpenaa). The present chief of Jisonaayili (2015), Alhaji Alhassan Abu was installed in February 2015 after his predecessor (Bomaha-naa Mahamadu) died in 2012.

See also

Kamina Barracks

References 

Communities in Ghana
Suburbs of Tamale, Ghana